Rhyd-ddu (Welsh  for 'black ford') is a small village in Snowdonia, North Wales which is a starting point for walks up Snowdon (via the Rhyd Ddu Path), Moel Hebog, Yr Aran and the Nantlle Ridge.

It lies on the A4085 between Beddgelert and Caernarfon, at its junction with the B4418 to Nantlle and Penygroes.

Rhyd Ddu railway station is one of the stops on the Welsh Highland Railway between Caernarfon and Porthmadog.

T. H. Parry-Williams, the poet, author and academic was born and raised at Rhyd-ddu. He twice won both the Chair and the Crown at the National Eisteddfod, in 1912 and 1915.

External links 

Walks from Rhyd Ddu and local information
The Rhyd-Ddu and Y Garn Walk
A blog about a model of Rhyd Ddu station and Fridd Isaf
www.geograph.co.uk : photos of Rhyd Ddu and surrounding area

Villages in Gwynedd
Villages in Snowdonia
Betws Garmon